"So What?" is a song by British punk band Anti-Nowhere League. It first appeared as the B-side of the band's debut 7" single "Streets of London", in 1981. It was added as a bonus track to We Are...The Leagues re-release in 2001.

History and controversy
The song was written, according to the band, after sitting in a pub one night and hearing two men try to outdo each other with stories of past experiences.  The song is therefore a retort to people who tell embellished stories to make themselves appear better than the person they are in conversation with.

The obscene lyrical content of the song caused the British police to seize all copies of the single from the band's distributors under the Obscene Publications Act and remove all copies from sale. The word "fuck" appeared in the first line of the song and the word “cunt” is used four times throughout the song    The song has subsequently been appended to various CD reissues of the We Are... The League album and has become an anthem for the band. Lyrics in the song include references to bestiality ("I fucked a sheep/I fucked a goat...") and acquiring sexually transmitted diseases ("I've had crabs, I've had lice/I've had the clap...").

Metallica cover
The song has been covered by Metallica and released as a B-side to the "Sad but True" single and later included on the Garage Inc. album; it is also a bonus track on the Asian version of Metallica. "So What?" would go on to become an in-concert standard for the band.  During the 1996 MTV Europe Music Awards, the band performed the song immediately after "Last Caress" instead of "King Nothing", which was off of their then-new album Load. Their entire performance was aired live and uncensored. Sum 41 often use the Metallica version as outro music played over the sound system at their concerts.

References

1981 songs
Anti-Nowhere League songs
Metallica songs